Astracantha is the genus name of:

 Astragalus, a leguminose flowering plant of which Astracantha is an alternative name.
 Astracantha (protist), a genus of Phaeodarea.